Kerguelenatica delicatula is a species of predatory sea snail, a marine gastropod mollusk in the family Naticidae, the moon snails.

Distribution

Description 
The maximum recorded shell length is 17 mm.

Habitat 
Minimum recorded depth is 45 m. Maximum recorded depth is 548 m.

References

 Dell, R. K. (1990). Antarctic Mollusca with special reference to the fauna of the Ross Sea. Bulletin of the Royal Society of New Zealand, Wellington 27: 1–311
 Engl, W. (2012). Shells of Antarctica. Hackenheim: Conchbooks. 402 pp.

External links
 mith E.A. (1902). VII. Mollusca. Report on the collections of natural history made in the Antarctic regions during the voyage of the "Southern Cross": 201-213, pls 24-25

Naticidae
Gastropods described in 1902